François Dessertenne (1917–2006) was a French physician who first described the special type of Ventricular tachycardia in 1966 known as Torsades de pointes.
In 1948, Dessertenne became the Assistant Professor of Medicine at Hôpital Lariboisière in France, assisting to Prof Yves Bouvrain (1910-2002).

References
 Dessertenne F. Ventricular tachycardia with two variable opposing foci. Arch Mal Coeur Vaiss 1966;59:263-72. .

Desertenne, Francois
1917 births
2006 deaths